Kanzel (Bayerischer Wald) is a mountain of Bavaria, Germany.

Mountains of Bavaria
Mountains of the Bavarian Forest